Per Dybvig (born 27 January 1964) is a Norwegian illustrator, visual artist and animator.

He was born in Stavanger. He has worked as cartoonist for the newspapers Rogalands Avis and Stavanger Aftenblad, and illustrated more than eighty books. His book illustrations include humorous books by Per Inge Torkelsen, the children's book series Svein og rotta by Marit Nicolaysen, the series on Doktor Proktor by Jo Nesbø, and children's books by Ingvar Ambjørnsen, Trond Brænne and Torgeir Rebolledo Pedersen.

He has received several awards for his picture books, including  in 2013, Stavanger municipality cultural award (2014), and Teskjekjerringprisen (2015).

References

1964 births
People from Stavanger
Norwegian illustrators
Norwegian editorial cartoonists
Norwegian caricaturists
Norwegian children's book illustrators
Norwegian animators
Living people